Nicola "Nicki" or "Nicky" Cochrane  (born 8 December 1993) in Glasgow, Scotland is a Scottish international field hockey player who plays as a goalkeeper for Scotland and Great Britain.

Cochrane attended Strathallan School and studied sport and recreation management at the University of Edinburgh.

She plays club hockey in the Investec Women's Hockey League Premier Division for Wimbledon. Cochrane has also played club hockey for Beeston, Clifton Robinsons and Edinburgh University Hockey Club.

On the 9 February 2017 she earned her 50th cap for Scotland v Russia at the 2016–17 Women's FIH Hockey World League Round 2 tournament in Valencia; Scotland won the match 2-1.

In January 2018 Cochrane was named in the Great Britain squad to tour Argentina.

References

External links
 Profile on Scottish Hockey
 Profile on GB Hockey
 

1993 births
Living people
People educated at Strathallan School
Alumni of the University of Edinburgh
Sportspeople from Dunblane
Scottish female field hockey players
Field hockey players at the 2018 Commonwealth Games
Wimbledon Hockey Club players
Women's England Hockey League players
Commonwealth Games competitors for Scotland
Field hockey players at the 2022 Commonwealth Games